Gustavo Kuerten was the defending champion but did not compete that year.

Carlos Moyá won in the final 7–6(7–4), 7–6(7–4) against Fernando Meligeni.

Seeds

  Tommy Haas (second round)
  Guillermo Cañas (first round)
  Nicolás Lapentti (first round)
  Albert Portas (second round)
  Carlos Moyá (champion)
  Félix Mantilla (second round)
  Jérôme Golmard (first round)
  David Nalbandian (first round)

Draw

Finals

Top half

Bottom half

External links
 2002 Abierto Mexicano Pegaso Draw

2002 Abierto Mexicano Pegaso
Singles